"Aman" is a song by Kosovo-Albanian singer and songwriter Dafina Zeqiri featuring Kosovo-Albanian rappers Ledri Vula and Lumi B released as a single on 1 July 2020 by Bzzz Entertainment and Moneyz. The song was written and composed by the three latter and mastered, mixed and produced by  producer Deard Sylejmani. An official music video was uploaded simultaneously with the single's release onto YouTube. The single experienced commercial success and peaked at number 4 in Albania and 79 in Switzerland.

Background and composition 

Following the announcement of her upcoming studio album, Dafinë moj, Zeqiri uploaded a photo on her social media where she teased "Aman", including a behind-the-scenes shot of the music video. "Aman", which runs two minutes and forty-eight seconds, was composed and written by Kosovo-Albanian musicians Dafina Zeqiri, Ledri Vula and Lumi B. The Albanian-language song was mastered, mixed and produced by Albanian producer Deard Sylejmani. It was made available for digital download and streaming on 1 July 2020 by Bzzz Entertainment and Moneyz.

Music video 

Produced by Entermedia, an accompanying music video for "Aman" was premiered onto the official YouTube channel of Dafina Zeqiri on 1 July 2020 at 15:00 (CET). Albanian international fashion designer, Drenusha Xharra, created Zeqiri's outfits in the music video, while hair styling and make-up was done by Albanian make-up artist Arbër Bytyqi. Upon its release, the video entered the YouTube Top 100 chart in Austria and Germany.

Personnel 

Credits adapted from Tidal and YouTube.

Dafina Zeqiricomposing, songwriting, vocals
Ledri Vulacomposing, songwriting, vocals
Lumi Bcomposing, songwriting, vocals
Deard Sylejmanimastering, mixing, producing

Track listing 

Digital download
"Aman"2:48

Charts

Release history

References 

2020 singles
2020 songs
Albanian-language songs
Dafina Zeqiri songs
Ledri Vula songs
Songs written by Dafina Zeqiri
Songs written by Ledri Vula